Daniele Solcia (born 7 March 2001) is an Italian professional footballer who plays as a centre-back for  club Virtus Francavilla, on loan from  club Atalanta.

Career 
Solcia began his youth career aged five at Tritium, before moving to Atalanta's youth sector.

On 22 July 2019, Solcia was sent on loan to Serie D side Pontisola, where he played 25 league games. On 1 September 2020, Solcia joined Serie C club Lucchese on loan. He made his professional debut on 27 September 2020, in a 3–3 home draw to Pergolettese.

On 31 July 2021, Solcia moved to newly-promoted Serie C side Seregno on a one-year loan. On 2 July 2022, Solcia was loaned to Virtus Francavilla.

Style of play 
A versatile defender, Solcia mainly plays as a centre-back, both on the right and on the left, and can also be used as a full-back.

References

External links 
 
 

2001 births
Living people
People from Treviglio
Footballers from Lombardy
Italian footballers
Association football central defenders
Tritium Calcio 1908 players
Atalanta B.C. players
A.C. Ponte San Pietro Isola S.S.D. players
S.S.D. Lucchese 1905 players
U.S. 1913 Seregno Calcio players
Virtus Francavilla Calcio players
Serie D players
Serie C players